Eliada Home is a national historic district located near Asheville, Buncombe County, North Carolina.  The district originally  encompassed 10 contributing buildings and 3 contributing sites associated with a youth home complex in suburban Asheville. Of the original 10, only 5 remain.  They included the early residential, administrative, and agricultural buildings of the home as well as a residence, a tabernacle site, a log guest cabin, and a cemetery. The primary buildings were the Main Building (built in 1915, but is no longer extant) and the Allred Cottage (1930). The buildings included representative examples of the Colonial Revival, Bungalow, Bungalow/craftsman, and Tudor Revival styles.

It was listed on the National Register of Historic Places in 1993.

Gallery

References

Historic districts on the National Register of Historic Places in North Carolina
Colonial Revival architecture in North Carolina
Tudor Revival architecture in North Carolina
Buildings and structures in Buncombe County, North Carolina
National Register of Historic Places in Buncombe County, North Carolina